Swingin' Down Yonder is the first full-length, 12-inch album recorded by Dean Martin for Capitol Records during three sessions in September and October 1954 and February 1955. According to the original sleeve notes, all the songs have a "common geographical root: the American South." In 1963, Capitol Records re-released Swingin' Down Yonder under the titled Southern Style.

The 1991 Capitol Records CD reissue added eight bonus tracks which for the most part uphold the Dixieland sound. By contrast, the 2005 Collectors' Choice reissue selected four bonus tracks of dubious connection to the American South, including "Under the Bridges of Paris".

Track listing

LP
Capitol T-576

Side A

Side B

7" EP Set (Same credits as LP)
Capitol F1-576

Side A

Side B

Capitol F2-576

Side A

Side B

Capitol F3-576

Side A

Side B

Compact Disc

1991 Capitol CD, Catalog Number CDP 7 94306 2 (original album plus eight more tracks)

2005 Collectors' Choice Music CD, Catalog Number WWCCM05992 (original album plus four more tracks)

Personnel
Dean Martin: Vocals
Dick Stabile: Leader
Vincent Terri: Guitar
Phil Stephens: Bass
Ray S. Toland: Drums/Contractor
Louis Brown: Piano
Gus Bivona: Saxophone (Sessions 3538 and 3544)
Charles O. Butler: Saxophone (Session 3690)
Edward R. Miller: Saxophone (Sessions 3538 and 3544)
Edward 'Ed' Rosa: Saxophone (Session 3690)
Milton Bernhardt: Trombone (Session 3690)
Francis L. 'Joe' Howard: Trombone
Thomas 'Tom' Pederson: Trombone (Sessions 3538 and 3544)
George M. Roberts: Trombone (Session 3544 and 3690)
Lloyd Ulyate: Trombone
Virgil P. Evans: Trumpet
Conrad Gozzo: Trumpet (Session 3690)
Emanuel 'Mannie' Klein: Trumpet (Sessions 3538 and 3544)
Charles E. Teagarden: Trumpet

References

Dean Martin albums
1955 albums
Capitol Records albums
Albums produced by Voyle Gilmore